Tiago Miguel Monteiro de Almeida (born 13 September 1990) is a Cape Verdean professional footballer who plays as a right back for Sūduva in A Lyga.

Honours
Moreirense
Taça da Liga winner: 2016–17.

References

External links

1990 births
Living people
Citizens of Cape Verde through descent
Cape Verdean footballers
Association football forwards
FC Politehnica Iași (2010) players
FC Hermannstadt players
Liga I players
Cape Verde international footballers
Cape Verdean expatriate footballers
Cape Verdean expatriate sportspeople in Romania
Expatriate footballers in Romania
Footballers from Lisbon
Portuguese footballers
C.D. Mafra players
C.D. Pinhalnovense players
C.F. União players
C.F. Os Belenenses players
Moreirense F.C. players
Académico de Viseu F.C. players
Primeira Liga players
Liga Portugal 2 players
Portuguese expatriate footballers
Portuguese expatriate sportspeople in Romania
Portuguese sportspeople of Cape Verdean descent